The Berufsgenossenschaftliches Universitätsklinikum Bergmannsheil (Bergmannsheil University Hospitals), full German name "Berufsgenossenschaftliches Universitätsklinikum Bergmannsheil GmbH", also referred to as "Bergmannsheil", formerly known as "Bergbau-Berufsgenossenschaftliche Krankenanstalten Bergmannsheil", is a tertiary teaching hospital in Bochum (NRW, Germany). It is a hospital of the Ruhr-University Bochum and part of the University Hospitals of the Ruhr-University of Bochum.

The Bergmannsheil is the world's oldest and also the largest emergency hospital.

History 
The first buildings of the Bergmannsheil were erected in 1888 in order to provide medical care for injured miners.

Over the decades additional departments and clinics were added, before the Bergmannsheil became a university hospital of the Ruhr University in 1977.

In 2007, the Bergmannsheil was privatized in form of a GmbH.

Fire disaster on September 30th, 2016 
In the night from September 29 to September 30, 2016 a fire broke out in a room on the sixth floor of building 1. The fire spread quickly over the entire ward and two adjacent storeys and continued to burn for several hours. The roof was completely destroyed by the fire. At least two persons were killed, 16 more were injured, three of which severely. The hospital declared stage 3 MCI, and subsequently several hundred staff members joined up. They were supported by 565 members of fire brigade and police from the whole Ruhr region, as well as Technisches Hilfswerk and emergency management forces of the state North Rhine-Westphalia. 126 persons could be rescued from building 1 and taken care of within the hospital. Subsequently, several functional areas and six wards with a total of 204 beds had to be put out of operation. Even after several days the fire brigades had to extinguish remaining fire pockets.

The fire resulted from arson committed by a patient, who was subsequently killed by the fire.

Facts and figures

Departments, centers and programs (overview) 
Surgical hospital and clinic
Surgical core hospital and trauma surgery
Visceral surgery
Cell biological and immunological research
Department for spinal cord injuries
Department for neurosurgery and neurotraumatology
Hospital for plastic surgery and burn traumatology
Hospital for cardiac and thoracic surgery
Hospital for anaesthesia, intensive care and pain therapy
Neurological hospital and clinic
Center for internal medicine
Medical hospital I
Hospital for general internal medicine
Department for endocrinology, metabolism, diabetes and intensive care
Department for gastroenterology and hepatology
Medical hospital II (cardiology and angiology)
Medical hospital III (pneumology, allergology and sleep medicine)
Company medical office
Chest pain unit
Institute for radiology, diagnostics and nuclear medicine
Institute for clinical chemistry, transfusion and laboratory medicine
Institute for pathology / mesothelioma register
Rehabilitation center
Pharmacy
Library
Ethics committee
Research institute for prevention and occupational medicine (IPA)
Hepatologic center
Interdisciplinary departments
 Accident and emergency unit (zNFA) 
 Hospitalisation ward
 Intermediate care unit (IMC)
Heart and circulation center of the Ruhr-University of Bochum
Competence center for mental disorders after occupational injuries
Lung center
Muscle center Ruhrgebiet
Disseminated sclerosis center
Stroke unit
Surgical reference center for limb tumors
Center for outpatient and inpatient treatment of diabetic foot syndrome
Bildungszentrum Bergmannsheil, a specialized institution for training and continued education of nurses

References

External links 
 Universitätsklinikum Bergmannsheil
 BGFA - Forschungsinstitut für Arbeitsmedizin der Deutschen Gesetzlichen Unfallversicherung, Institut der Ruhr-Universität Bochum
 CareCenter Bergmannsheil
 Wi-Med Bergmannsheil Dienstleistung GmbH

Hospital buildings completed in 1988
Teaching hospitals in Germany
Bergmannsheil
Buildings and structures in Bochum
Hospitals established in 1888
1888 establishments in Germany
Medical and health organisations based in North Rhine-Westphalia